Below is the list of asteroid close approaches to Earth in 2014.

Timeline of known close approaches less than one lunar distance from Earth in 2014 
A list of known near-Earth asteroid close approaches less than 1 lunar distance (384,400 km or 0.00256 AU) from Earth in 2014.

This year, 3 asteroids were detected which traveled nearer than this, most notably 2014 AA, which impacted. This list does not include any of the other 32 objects that collided with earth in 2014, none of which were discovered in advance, but were recorded by sensors designed to detect detonation of nuclear devices (of the 33 objects detected 5 had an impact energy greater than that of a 1 kiloton device).

Warning Times by Size 
This sub-section visualises the warning times of the close approaches listed in the above table, depending on the size of the asteroid. The sizes of the charts show the relative sizes of the asteroids to scale. For comparison, the approximate size of a person is also shown. This is based the absolute magnitude of each asteroid, an approximate measure of size based on brightness.

Abs Magnitude 30 and greater
 (size of a person for comparison)

Abs Magnitude 29-30

Absolute Magnitude 28-29

Absolute Magnitude 27-28

Absolute Magnitude 26-27

Absolute Magnitude 25-26

Notes

Timeline of close approaches less than one Lunar distance from the Moon in 2014 
The number of asteroids listed here are significantly less than those of asteroids approaching Earth for several reasons:
 Asteroids approaching Earth not only move faster, but are brighter and are easier to detect with modern surveys due to these factors
 Asteroids approaching closer to Earth are higher priority to confirm, and only confirmed asteroids are listed with a lunocentric approach distance
 Those which make close approaches to the Moon are frequently lost in its glare, making them harder to confirm, and are more easily discovered during the new Moon, when the Moon is too close to the Sun for any asteroids to be detected while they are near to the Moon anyway.

These factors combined severely limit the amount of Moon-approaching asteroids, to a level many times lower than the detected asteroids to pass just as close to Earth instead.

Notes

Additional examples

An example list of near-Earth asteroids that passed more than 1 lunar distance (384,400 km or 0.00256 AU) from Earth in 2014.
 (~300 meters in diameter) passed 6.2 lunar distances from Earth on 10 February 2014.
 (~3 meters in diameter) may have passed as close as 0.97 lunar distances (371,000 km) from Earth (0.68 lunar distances (261,000 km) from the Moon on either April 14 or 15th, 2014, but the nominal orbit calculates an approach of 1.29 lunar distances (495,000 km) from Earth (1.23 lunar distances (473,000 km) from the Moon).
 (~25 meters in diameter) passed 1.1 lunar distances from Earth on 3 June 2014.
 (~325 meters in diameter) passed 3.25 lunar distances from Earth on 8 June 2014.
 (~75 meters in diameter) passed  from Earth on 18 August 2014.
 (~10 meters in diameter) passed 1.1 lunar distances from Earth on 23 September 2014.
 (~60 meters in diameter) passed 1.5 lunar distances from Earth on 24 October 2014.

See also 
List of asteroid close approaches to Earth
List of asteroid close approaches to Earth in 2013
List of asteroid close approaches to Earth in 2015

References 

 
close approaches to Earth in 2014
Near-Earth asteroids